The Inland Empire metropolitan area and region of Southern California, which sits directly east of the Los Angeles metropolitan area, covers more than . The metropolitan area consists of Riverside County and San Bernardino County and is home to over 4 million people. The Inland Empire contains many museums, which are defined for this context as institutions (including nonprofit organizations, government entities, and private businesses) that collect and care for objects of cultural, artistic, scientific, or historical interest and make their collections or related exhibits available for public viewing. It includes non-profit and university art galleries. Museums that exist only in cyberspace (i.e., virtual museums) are not included in this list.

Defunct museums
 A Special Place Children's Museum, San Bernardino 
 Heartland, California Museum of the Heart, Rancho Mirage 
 Southern California Medical Museum, Riverside, moved to Western University of Health Sciences in Pomona in 2015

See also

National Register of Historic Places listings in Riverside County, California
National Register of Historic Places listings in San Bernardino County, California

References

External links
 California State Association of Counties (CSAC)

List of museums
Inland Empire